This is an incomplete list of Statutory Rules of Northern Ireland in 1994.

1-100

 Health and Safety (Training for Employment) Regulations (Northern Ireland) 1994 (S.R. 1994 No. 1)
 Disclosure of Interests in Shares (Amendment) Regulations (Northern Ireland) 1994 (S.R. 1994 No. 2)
 Redundancy Payments (Health and Personal Social Services) (Modification) Order (Northern Ireland) 1994 (S.R. 1994 No. 8)
 Pension Schemes (1993 Act) (Commencement No. 1) Order (Northern Ireland) 1994 (S.R. 1994 No. 17)
 Social Security (Adjudication) (Amendment) Regulations (Northern Ireland) 1994 (S.R. 1994 No. 21)
 Companies (1990 Order) (Commencement No. 5) Order (Northern Ireland) 1994 (S.R. 1994 No. 47)
 Fair Employment (Increase of Compensation Limit) Order (Northern Ireland) 1994 (S.R. 1994 No. 50)
 Health and Social Services Trusts (Consequential Amendments No. 2) Regulations (Northern Ireland) 1994 (S.R. 1994 No. 66)
 Social Security Benefits Up-rating Order (Northern Ireland) 1994 (S.R. 1994 No. 74)
 Social Security Benefits Up-rating Regulations (Northern Ireland) 1994 (S.R. 1994 No. 75)
 Social Security (Contributions) (Re-rating and Northern Ireland National Insurance Fund Payments) Order (Northern Ireland) 1994 (S.R. 1994 No. 79)
 Statutory Sick Pay (Rate of Payment) Order (Northern Ireland) 1994 (S.R. 1994 No. 82)
 Social Security Pensions (Home Responsibilities) Regulations (Northern Ireland) 1994 (S.R. 1994 No. 89)
 Social Security (Contributions) (Miscellaneous Amendments) Regulations (Northern Ireland 1994 (S.R. 1994 No. 94)

101-200

 Alkali, &c. Works (Amendment) Order (Northern Ireland) 1994 (S.R. 1994 No. 104)
 Occupational Pension Schemes (Deficiency on Winding Up, etc.) Regulations (Northern Ireland) 1994 (S.R. 1994 No. 107)
 Partnerships and Unlimited Companies (Accounts) Regulations (Northern Ireland) 1994 (S.R. 1994 No. 133)
 Genetically Modified Organisms (1991 Order) (Commencement No. 1) Order (Northern Ireland) 1994 (S.R. 1994 No. 141)
 Access to Health Records (1993 Order) (Commencement) Order (Northern Ireland) 1994 (S.R. 1994 No. 151)
 Maternity Allowance and Statutory Maternity Pay Regulations (Northern Ireland) 1994 (S.R. 1994 No. 176)
 Alkali, &c. Works and Clean Air (Metrication) Regulations (Northern Ireland) 1994 (S.R. 1994 No. 192)
 Public Health (Metrication) Regulations (Northern Ireland) 1994 (S.R. 1994 No. 193)

201-300

 Industrial Relations (1993 Order) (Commencement No. 2) Order (Northern Ireland) 1994 (S.R. 1994 No. 215)
 Social Security (Cyprus) Order (Northern Ireland) 1994 (S.R. 1994 No. 262)

301-400

 Social Security (Industrial Injuries) (Prescribed Diseases) (Amendment) Regulations (Northern Ireland) 1994 (S.R. 1994 No. 347)
 Social Security (Severe Disablement Allowance and Invalid Care Allowance) (Amendment) Regulations (Northern Ireland) 1994 (S.R. 1994 No. 370)
 Social Security (Adjudication) (Amendment No. 3) Regulations (Northern Ireland) 1994 (S.R. 1994 No. 396)

401-500

 Social Security (Jersey and Guernsey) Order (Northern Ireland) 1994 (S.R. 1994 No. 427)
 Companies (1986 Order) (Insurance Companies Accounts) Regulations (Northern Ireland) 1994 (S.R. 1994 No. 428)
 Insurance Accounts Directive (Miscellaneous Insurance Undertakings) Regulations (Northern Ireland) 1994 (S.R. 1994 No. 429)
 Criminal Justice (1994 Order) (Commencement) Order (Northern Ireland) 1994 (S.R. 1994 No. 446)
 Social Security (Incapacity for Work) (1994 Order) (Commencement) Order (Northern Ireland) 1994 (S.R. 1994 No. 450)
 Social Security (Incapacity Benefit) Regulations (Northern Ireland) 1994 (S.R. 1994 No. 461)
 Social Security (Severe Disablement Allowance) (Amendment) Regulations (Northern Ireland) 1994 (S.R. 1994 No. 462)
 Social Security (Incapacity Benefit — Increases for Dependants) Regulations (Northern Ireland) 1994 (S.R. 1994 No. 485)
 Industrial Relations (Deregulation and Contracting Out Act 1994) (Commencement) Order (Northern Ireland) 1994 (S.R. 1994 No. 488)

External links
  Statutory Rules (NI) List
 Draft Statutory Rules (NI) List

1994
Statutory rules
Northern Ireland Statutory Rules